During the American Civil War 11 Southern slave states declared their secession from the United States and formed the Confederate States of America, also known as "the Confederacy". Led by Jefferson Davis, the Confederacy fought for its independence from the United States. Below is a list of those who served in the Confederate States Department of the Treasury.



Secretary of the Treasury

Assistant Secretary of the Treasury

References

Confederate States Department of the Treasury officials